Nick Faldo's Championship Golf is a golf video game published by Grandslam Entertainment for the Commodore 64 in 1992. Versions for Amiga, Amiga CD32, Commodore 64, and MS-DOS followed. It centers around British golf champion Nick Faldo.

Reception

References

External links
Nick Faldo's Championship Golf at the Amiga Hall of Light

Amiga games
Amiga CD32 games
Commodore 64 games
DOS games
Golf video games
1992 video games
Video games scored by Mark Cooksey
Video games developed in the United Kingdom
Faldo
Faldo
Video games based on real people
Arc Developments games